Mrs. Minnie Alexander Cottage is a historic home located at Asheville, Buncombe County, North Carolina.  It was designed by Richard Sharp Smith and built about 1905. It is a two-story, rectangular frame dwelling with a number of projecting bays.  The exterior walls are plastered with a roughcast concrete aggregate.  It has a hip roof with deep overhanging eaves and brackets.  The house has been converted to accommodate offices.

It was listed on the National Register of Historic Places in 1989.

References

External links

Houses on the National Register of Historic Places in North Carolina
Houses completed in 1905
Houses in Asheville, North Carolina
National Register of Historic Places in Buncombe County, North Carolina
1905 establishments in North Carolina